Tanu Roy is an Indian actress and model. A Bengali by birth, she has predominantly appeared in Telugu films apart from some Tamil, Malayalam, Bengali and Kannada films. She is mostly known for her item numbers in films like Mass and Hero. She is known for her role in the Malayalam movie Ee Adutha Kalathu.

Career
Tanu Roy was born and brought up in Kolkata. She is a commerce graduate. She made her acting debut in 2001 with Puri Jagannadh's Itlu Sravani Subramanyam, after which she played small roles in Anandam and Manasantha Nuvve. She appeared in Avunu Nijame  and Kodi Ramakrishna's Keelugurram. Later, she starred in low budget B movies and did many item numbers in films including Satyam, Mass, No, Viyyalavari Kayyalu  and Pellikani Prasad.

She was seen in two Bengali films; Basho Na, in which she portrayed the role of a young widow, and Moner Majho Tumhi, a remake of Mansantha Nuvve, and in the Kannada films Love Story, which is a remake of the Telugu film Maro Charitra and was earlier titled Prema Charitra. The first Kannada film she shot for, Preethi Maadabaaradu, was shelved in the middle. In Tamil, she starred in the films Indru  and Girivalam, a remake of the Hindi film Humraaz.

Tanu made her debut in Malayalam in the 2012 film Ee Adutha Kaalathu as Tanushree Ghosh and won critical acclaim for her portrayal of Madhuri, the mother of a 10-year-old boy. In Orissa, she played a social activist, who works for the welfare of tribal people in a village.

Her upcoming film is Amar Babu's Ala Jarigindi Oka Roju, which is the Telugu remake of the 2006 British crime comedy flick, Big Nothing. She has also shot for a cameo in Hashim Marrikar's Preview.

She also participated in the Telugu television shows Naacho Rrey  and Humma Humma.

Filmography

References

External links 
 
 

Indian film actresses
Actresses in Bengali cinema
Actresses in Tamil cinema
Actresses in Kannada cinema
Living people
Actresses in Malayalam cinema
Bengali Hindus
21st-century Indian actresses
Actresses in Telugu cinema
Actresses from Hyderabad, India
Year of birth missing (living people)